The 1970 Washington Huskies football team was an American football team that represented the University of Washington in the Pacific-8 Conference during the 1970 NCAA University Division football season.  Led by fourteenth-year head coach Jim Owens, the Huskies compiled a 6–4 record (4–3 in Pac-8, tied for second), and outscored their opponents 334 to 216.

The Huskies were led on the field by sophomore quarterback Sonny Sixkiller, who set numerous team records. Fullback Bo Cornell and defensive tackle Tom Failla were the team captains.

This was the final year of a ten-game schedule for Washington; the other seven teams in the Pac-8 played eleven games.

Schedule

Roster

All-conference

NFL Draft selections
Four UW Huskies were selected in the 1971 NFL Draft, which lasted seventeen rounds with 442 selections.

References

External links
 Game program: Washington vs. Washington State at Spokane – November 21, 1970

Washington
Washington Huskies football seasons
Washington Huskies football